The final of the Men's triple jump event at the 2003 Pan American Games took place on Friday August 8, 2003. Cuba's Yoandri Betanzos took the title in his fifth attempt, jumping 17.26 metres.

Medalists

Records

Results

See also
2003 World Championships in Athletics – Men's triple jump
Athletics at the 2004 Summer Olympics – Men's triple jump

References
Results

Triple jump, Men
2003